Richard Power, 1st Baron Power of Curraghmore (died 1539)

Birth and origins 
Richard was the eldest son of Piers Power and his first wife. His family name is also given as Poer. His father was "lord" of Curraghmore, County Waterford. His father's family is Old English.

His mother, whose first name is unknown, was a daughter of Gerald FitzGerald of Decies, the second son of James FitzGerald, 6th Earl of Desmond, also numbered as the 7th earl, called the Usurper. This second son had been given Decies (see the modern baronies of Decies-within-Drum and Decies-without-Drum) as appanage and thus became the first lord of Decies.

He had three brothers: Piers Power of Brenane, Nicholas Power of Corduff, and William Power, Knight of St. John of Jerusalem; as well as a sister: Ellen, who married Walter Power of Donoyle.

Marriage and Children 
Power married Catherine, second daughter of Piers Butler, 8th Earl of Ormond.

 
Richard and Catherine had three sons:
 Piers (1522–1544), who succeeded as the 2nd baron but died unmarried – for the 2nd Baron
 John (1529/30 – 1592), who succeeded as the 3rd baron and married Eleanor, 3rd daughter of James FitzGerald, 13th Earl of Desmond.
 Thomas of Coolfin

–and two daughters:
 Katherine, married Sir Nicholas Devereux of Ballymagir
 Elice, married Thomas FitzGerald, father of James fitz Thomas FitzGerald, theSugan Earl.

Baron 
Power was created Baron "Le Power and Coroghmore" by a patent dated 13 September 1535.

Death 
Power was killed on 10 November 1538 by Connor O'Callaghan during an Irish rebellion.

Notes and references

Notes

Citations

Sources 

 
  – L to Z
 
  – N to R
  – Oakham to Richmond (snippet view)
 
 
 

 

1539 deaths
High Sheriffs of County Waterford
Peers of Ireland created by Henry VIII
Year of birth unknown